A change machine is a vending machine that accepts large denominations of currency and returns an equal amount of currency in smaller bills or coins.  Typically these machines are used to provide coins in exchange for paper currency, in which case they are also often known as bill changers.

In the US, these devices are typically seen in the vicinity of machines that will not accept paper currency. This can be in a parking facility that has parking meters, in laundromats, or near vending machines that lack bill validators and don't accept paper currency.

Before the advent of coinless slot machines, casinos would sometimes have change machines that would accept paper currency and return coins or tokens that could be used in the machines.  A similar arrangement has often been found at video arcades.

In some cases, a machine may subtract a small amount (e.g. 5 cents) as a surcharge for the transaction.

See also

 Automated cash handling
 Manual fare collection#Coin dispenser
 Money changer

Currency
Vending machines